The Internazionali di Tennis d'Abruzzo is a professional tennis tournament played on clay courts. It is currently part of the Association of Tennis Professionals (ATP) Challenger Tour. It is held annually in Francavilla al Mare, Italy since 2017.

Igor Zelenay is the doubles record holder with two titles.

Past finals

Singles

Doubles

References

ATP Challenger Tour
Clay court tennis tournaments
Tennis tournaments in Italy
Recurring sporting events established in 2017